The National Junior Angus Show is the premier youth cattle-raising show held every year in the midwestern United States.  The young farmers exhibit Angus cattle for prizes.  In July 2008, it was held at the Iowa State Fair grounds in Des Moines, Iowa.  Over 1,000 young persons aged 9 to 21 years of age exhibit, attend mentoring workshops, and compete, in this show, which has taken place for 42 years.

References

External links
 National Junior Angus Show official web site
 National Junior Angus Association official web site

Agricultural shows in the United States